Edmund John Bilton (23 May 1839 — 24 August 1916) was an English first-class cricketer.

The son of James and Rebecca Bilton (née Ship), he was born at Cambridge in May 1839. A keen cricketer, he made three appearances in first-class cricket between 1859 and 1866 as a wicket-keeper for Cambridge Town Club (playing as Cambridgeshire in 1866), with all three of his first-class matches coming against Cambridge University. He scored 25 runs in his three matches, with a highest score of 11. Outside of cricket, Bilton was by profession a clerk and music teacher; his musical interest included his membership of both the King's College and Trinity College choirs at the University of Cambridge. Bilton died at Cambridge in August 1916.

References

External links

1839 births
1916 deaths
Cricketers from Cambridgeshire
Sportspeople from Cambridge
English cricketers
Cambridge Town Club cricketers
Clerks
Choristers of the Choir of King's College, Cambridge